Rader v. State, 73 Tenn. 610 (1880), was a case decided by the Tennessee Supreme Court that held that to fulfill requirement of deliberation for first degree murder the purpose to kill may be formed a mere moment before the act, but deliberation does require some length of time for cool reflection free from excitement or passion.

W.H. Rader killed W.T. Thomas in December 1879 in Bristol, Tennessee in a store owned by J.M. Barker. Rader and Thomas worked together in Barker's store, and there was a dispute over a 30¢ box of shirt collars Rader had asked Thomas to give him on credit. The two fought with knives, and Rader fatally wounded Thomas on the neck, in full view of witnesses. Rader was convicted of first degree murder and sentenced to life imprisonment. He appealed on a number of bases, and obtained a new trial because the Supreme Court found that the State had failed to prove the deliberation and premeditation required to sustain a conviction for first degree murder.

References

United States murder case law
1880 in United States case law
Murder in Tennessee
Tennessee state case law
1880 in Tennessee
Bristol, Tennessee
Murder trials